The Gate of Youth may refer to:

, a Japanese novel series by Hiroyuki Itsuki
Adaptations
 The Gate of Youth (1975 film)
 The Gate of Youth (1981 film)